Fefe may refer to:
 Fe'fe' language, a language spoken in parts of Cameroon
 Féfé (born 1976), real name Samuël Adebiyi, French rapper and hip hop artist of Nigerian origin
 Fefe Dobson, a Canadian singer-songwriter
 Fefe, nickname of Felix von Leitner, a German computer security expert and blogger
 Fefè is also a nickname, used in Sicily for somebody named Ferdinando
 "Fefe" (song), a song by the American rapper 6ix9ine

See also 
 U+FEFF, the Unicode character used to signal the byte order of a text file or stream